State of Triumph – Chapter Two is second album recorded by the German power metal band Metalium. It was released in 2000, following their first release, Millennium Metal - Chapter One and continues the story which began in the first album.

Track listing
All songs by Lange and Ratz, except "Music" by John Miles and "Dust in the Wind" by Kerry Livgren.

"Elements" - 1:42
"Steel Avenger" - 3:21
"Years of Darion" - 5:06
"Break Out" - 4:11
"Erania" - 4:27
"Stygian Flames" - 4:16
"Prophecy" - 7:55
"Eye of the Storm" - 4:24
"Inner Sight" - 5:54
"State of Triumph" - 7:40
"Music" - 5:55

Japanese bonus track
"Dust in the Wind" (Kansas cover)

Personnel
Band members
Henning Basse - vocals  
Matthias Lange - guitars  
Jack Frost - guitars  
Lars Ratz - bass, producer, mixing  
Mark Cross - drums

Additional musicians
Paul Morris - keyboards and orchestration
Jutta Weinhold, Jacqueline Wenk, Simone Barthel, Uta Delbridge - backing vocals

Production
JP Genkel - co-producer, engineer, mixing

References

External links
Metalium Official Website

Metalium albums
2000 albums
Massacre Records albums